Senegal, officially the Republic of Senegal, is a country in West Africa, on the Atlantic Ocean coastline. Senegal is bordered by Mauritania to the north, Mali to the east, Guinea to the southeast and Guinea-Bissau to the southwest. Senegal nearly surrounds the Gambia, a country occupying a narrow sliver of land along the banks of the Gambia River, which separates Senegal's southern region of Casamance from the rest of the country. Senegal also shares a maritime border with Cape Verde. Senegal's economic and political capital is Dakar.

Senegal is notably the westernmost country in the mainland of the Old World, or Afro-Eurasia. It owes its name to the Senegal River, which borders it to the east and north. The climate is typically Sahelian, though there is a rainy season. Senegal covers a land area of almost  and has a population of around  million. The state is a unitary presidential republic; since the country's foundation in 1960, it has been recognized as one of the most stable countries on the African continent.

The state was formed as part of the independence of French West Africa from French colonial rule. Because of this history, French is the official language, but it is understood only by a minority of the population. Over 30 languages are spoken in Senegal, and Wolof is the most widely spoken one, with 80% of the population speaking it as a first or second language, acting as Senegal's lingua franca alongside French. Like other post-colonial African states, the country includes a wide mix of ethnic and linguistic communities, with the largest being the Wolof, Fula, and Serer people. Senegalese people are predominantly Muslim.

Senegal is classified as a heavily indebted poor country, with relatively low HDI ranked 170th in the Human Development index. Most of the population is on the coast and works in agriculture or other food industries; other major industries include mining, tourism, and services. The country does not have notable natural resources, but the basis of its development lies in education, where almost half the state's budget is spent. Senegal is a member state of the African Union, the United Nations, the Economic Community of West African States (ECOWAS), Organisation internationale de la Francophonie, the Organisation of Islamic Cooperation, and the Community of Sahel-Saharan States. Internationally, Senegal is best known in the sporting world for the Paris-Dakar Rally.

Etymology 
The country of Senegal is named after the Senegal River. The name of the river may derive from a Portuguese transliteration of the name of the Zenaga, also known as the Sanhaja. It is also possible that it derives from the Wolof phrase "Sunuu Gaal," which means "our canoe".

History

Early and pre-colonial eras
Archaeological findings throughout the area indicate that Senegal was inhabited in prehistoric times and has been continuously occupied by various ethnic groups. Some kingdoms were created around the seventh century: Takrur in the ninth century, Namandiru and the Jolof Empire during the 13th and 14th centuries. Eastern Senegal was once part of the Ghana Empire.

Islam was introduced through Toucouleur and Soninke contact with the Almoravid dynasty of the Maghreb, who in turn propagated it with the help of the Almoravids and Toucouleur allies. This movement faced resistance from ethnicities of traditional religions, the Serers in particular.

In the 13th and 14th centuries, the area came under the influence of the empires to the east; the Jolof Empire of Senegal was also founded during this time. In the Senegambia region, between 1300 and 1900, close to one-third of the population was enslaved, typically as a result of being taken captive in warfare.

In the 14th century the Jolof Empire grew more powerful, having united Cayor and the kingdoms of Baol, Siné, Saloum, Waalo, Futa Tooro and Bambouk, or much of present-day West Africa. The empire was a voluntary confederacy of various states rather than being built on military conquest. The empire was founded by Ndiadiane Ndiaye, a part Serer and part Toucouleur, who was able to form a coalition with many ethnicities, but collapsed around 1549 with the defeat and killing of Lele Fouli Fak by Amari Ngone Sobel Fall.

Colonial era

In the mid-15th century, the Portuguese landed on the Senegal coastline, followed by traders representing other countries, including the French. Various European powers—Portugal, the Netherlands, and Great Britain—competed for trade in the area from the 15th century onward.

In 1677, France gained control of what had become a minor departure point in the Atlantic slave trade: the island of Gorée next to modern Dakar, used as a base to purchase slaves from the warring chiefdoms on the mainland.

European missionaries introduced Christianity to Senegal and the Casamance in the 19th century. It was only in the 1850s that the French began to expand onto the Senegalese mainland, after they abolished slavery and began promoting an abolitionist doctrine, adding native kingdoms like the Waalo, Cayor, Baol, and Jolof Empire. French colonists progressively invaded and took over all the kingdoms, except Siné and Saloum, under Governor Louis Faidherbe.

Yoro Dyao was in command of the canton of Foss-Galodjina and was set over Wâlo (Ouâlo) by Louis Faidherbe, where he served as a chief from 1861 to 1914. Senegalese resistance to the French expansion and curtailing of their lucrative slave trade was led in part by Lat-Dior, Damel of Cayor, and Maad a Sinig Kumba Ndoffene Famak Joof, the Maad a Sinig of Siné, resulting in the Battle of Logandème.

In 1915, over 300 Senegalese came under Australian command, ahead of the taking of Damascus by Australians, before the expected arrival of the famed Lawrence of Arabia. French and British diplomacy in the area were thrown into disarray.

On 25 November 1958, Senegal became an autonomous republic within the French Community.

Independence 
In January 1959, Senegal and the French Sudan merged to form the Mali Federation, which became fully independent on 20 June 1960, as a result of a transfer of power agreement signed with France on 4 April 1960. Due to internal political difficulties, the Federation broke up on 20 August 1960 when Senegal and French Sudan (renamed the Republic of Mali) each proclaimed independence.

Léopold Sédar Senghor, internationally known poet, politician, and statesman, was elected Senegal's first president in August 1960. Pro-African, Senghor advocated a brand of African socialism.

After the breakup of the Mali Federation, President Senghor and Prime Minister Mamadou Dia governed together under a parliamentary system. In December 1962, their political rivalry led to an attempted coup by Prime Minister Dia. The coup was put down without bloodshed and Dia was arrested and imprisoned. Senegal adopted a new constitution that consolidated the President's power.

Senghor was considerably more tolerant of opposition than most African leaders became in the 1960s. Nonetheless, political activity was somewhat restricted for a time. Senghor's party, the Senegalese Progressive Union (now the Socialist Party of Senegal), was the only legally permitted party from 1965 until 1975.  In the latter year, Senghor allowed the formation of two opposition parties that began operation in 1976—a Marxist party (the African Independence Party) and a liberal party (the Senegalese Democratic Party).

The 1960s and early 1970s saw the continued and persistent violating of Senegal's borders by the Portuguese military from Portuguese Guinea. In response, Senegal petitioned the United Nations Security Council in 1963, 1965, 1969 (in response to shelling by Portuguese artillery), 1971 and finally in 1972.

1980 to present 
In 1980, President Senghor decided to retire from politics. The next year, he transferred power in 1981 to his hand-picked successor, Abdou Diouf. Former prime minister Mamadou Dia, who was Senghor's rival, ran for election in 1983 against Diouf, but lost. Senghor moved to France, where he died at the age of 95.

In the 1980s, Boubacar Lam discovered Senegalese oral history that was initially compiled by the Tuculor noble, Yoro Dyâo, not long after World War I, which documented migrations into West Africa from the Nile Valley; ethnic groups, from the Senegal River to the Niger Delta, retained traditions of having an eastern origin.

Senegal joined with The Gambia to form the nominal Senegambia Confederation on 1 February 1982. However, the union was dissolved in 1989. Despite peace talks, a southern separatist group (Movement of Democratic Forces of Casamance or MFDC) in the Casamance region has clashed sporadically with government forces since 1982 in the Casamance conflict. In the early 21st century, violence has subsided and President Macky Sall held talks with rebels in Rome in December 2012.

Abdou Diouf was president between 1981 and 2000. He encouraged broader political participation, reduced government involvement in the economy, and widened Senegal's diplomatic engagements, particularly with other developing nations. Domestic politics on occasion spilled over into street violence, border tensions, and a violent separatist movement in the southern region of the Casamance. Nevertheless, Senegal's commitment to democracy and human rights strengthened. Abdou Diouf served four terms as president.

During the Gulf War, over 500 Senegalese participated in the Battle of Khafji and the unexpected Liberation of Kuwait campaign, under the command of the U.S.-led coalition.

In the presidential election of 1999, opposition leader Abdoulaye Wade defeated Diouf in an election deemed free and fair by international observers. Senegal experienced its second peaceful transition of power, and its first from one political party to another. On 30 December 2004 President Wade announced that he would sign a peace treaty with the separatist group in the Casamance region. This, however, has yet to be implemented. There was a round of talks in 2005, but the results have not yet yielded a resolution.

In March 2012, the incumbent president Abdoulaye Wade lost the presidential election and Macky Sall was elected as the new President of Senegal. President Macky Sall was re-elected in 2019 elections. The presidential term was reduced from seven years to five.

Since 3 March 2021, Senegal has been rocked by a series of mass protests in response to the arrest of Ousmane Sonko for alleged rape and mishandling of the COVID-19 pandemic.

Government and politics 

Senegal is a republic with a presidency; the president is elected every five years as of 2016, previously being seven years from independence to 2001, five years from 2001 to 2008, and seven years again from 2008 to 2016,  by adult voters. The first president, Léopold Sédar Senghor, was a poet and writer, and was the first African elected to the Académie française. Senegal's second president, Abdou Diouf, later served as general secretary of the Organisation de la Francophonie. The third president was Abdoulaye Wade, a lawyer. The current president is Macky Sall, elected in March 2012 and reelected in February 2019.

Senegal has more than 80 political parties. The unicameral parliament consists of the National Assembly, which has 150 seats (a Senate was in place from 1999 to 2001 and 2007 to 2012). An independent judiciary also exists in Senegal. The nation's highest courts that deal with business issues are the constitutional council and the court of justice, members of which are named by the president.

Political culture
Currently, Senegal has a quasi-democratic political culture, one of the more successful post-colonial democratic transitions in Africa. Local administrators are appointed and held accountable by the president. Marabouts, religious leaders of the various Muslim brotherhoods of Senegal, have also exercised a strong political influence in the country especially during Wade's presidency. In 2009, Freedom House downgraded Senegal's status from "Free" to "Partially Free", based on increased centralisation of power in the executive. By 2014, it had recovered its Free status.

In 2008, Senegal finished in 12th position on the Ibrahim Index of African Governance. The Ibrahim Index is a comprehensive measure of African governance (limited to sub-Saharan Africa until 2008), based on a number of different variables which reflect the success with which governments deliver essential political goods to their citizens. When the Northern African countries were added to the index in 2009, Senegal's 2008 position was retroactively downgraded to 15th place (with Tunisia, Egypt and Morocco placing ahead of Senegal). , Senegal's Ibrahim Index rank has declined another point to 16th of 52 African countries.

On 22 February 2011, Senegal severed diplomatic ties with Iran, saying it supplied rebels with weapons which killed Senegalese troops in the Casamance conflict.

The 2012 presidential election was controversial due to President Wade's candidacy, as the opposition argued he should not be considered eligible to run again. Several youth opposition movements, including M23 and Y'en a Marre, emerged in June 2011. In the end, Macky Sall of the Alliance for the Republic won, and Wade conceded the election to Sall. This peaceful and democratic transition was hailed by many foreign observers, such as the EU as a show of "maturity".

On 19 September 2012, lawmakers voted to do away with the Senate to save an estimated $15 million.

In August 2017, the ruling party won a landslide victory in the parliamentary election. President Macky Sall's ruling coalition took 125 seats in the 165-seat National Assembly. In 2019 president Macky Sall easily won re-election in the first round.

Administrative divisions

Senegal is subdivided into 14 regions, each administered by a Conseil Régional (Regional Council) elected by population weight at the Arrondissement level. The country is further subdivided by 45 Départements, 113 Arrondissements (neither of which have administrative function) and by Collectivités Locales, which elect administrative officers.

Regional capitals have the same name as their respective regions:

 Dakar
 Diourbel
 Fatick
 Kaffrine
 Kaolack
 Kédougou
 Kolda
 Louga
 Matam
 Saint-Louis
 Sédhiou
 Tambacounda
 Thiès
 Ziguinchor

Foreign relations

Senegal has a high profile in many international organizations and was a member of the UN Security Council in 1988–89 and 2015–2016. It was elected to the UN Commission on Human Rights in 1997. Friendly to the West, especially to France and the United States, Senegal has vigorously advocated more assistance from developed countries to the Third World.

Senegal enjoys mostly cordial relations with its neighbors. In spite of clear progress on other issues with Mauritania (border security, resource management, economic integration, etc.), an estimated 35,000 Mauritanian refugees (of the estimated 40,000 who were expelled from their home country in 1989) remain in Senegal.

Senegal is well integrated with the main bodies of the international community, including the Economic Community of West African States (ECOWAS), the African Union (AU), and the Community of Sahel-Saharan States.

Military

The Armed Forces of Senegal consist of about 17,000 personnel in the army, air force, navy, and gendarmerie. The Senegalese military receives most of its training, equipment, and support from France and the United States, and to a lesser extent Germany.

Military noninterference in political affairs has contributed to Senegal's stability since independence. Senegal has participated in many international and regional peacekeeping missions. Most recently, in 2000, Senegal sent a battalion to the Democratic Republic of Congo to participate in MONUC, the United Nations peacekeeping mission, and agreed to deploy a US-trained battalion to Sierra Leone for UNAMSIL, another UN peacekeeping mission.

In 2015, Senegal participated in the Saudi Arabian-led military intervention in Yemen against the Shia Houthis.

Law
Senegal is a secular state, as defined in its Constitution.

To fight corruption, the government has created the National Anti-Corruption Office (OFNAC) and the Commission of Restitution and Recovery of Illegally Acquired Assets. According to Business Anti-Corruption Portal, President Sall created the OFNAC to replace the Commission Nationale de Lutte Contre la non Transparence, la Corruption et la Concussion (CNLCC). It is said that the OFNAC represents a more effective tool for fighting corruption than the CNLCC established under former President Wade. The mission of OFNAC is to fight corruption, embezzlement of public funds and fraud. OFNAC has the power of self-referral (own initiative investigation). OFNAC is composed of twelve members appointed by decree.

Homosexuality is illegal in Senegal. According to 2013 survey by the Pew Research Center, 96% of Senegalese believe that homosexuality should not be accepted by society.  LGBTQ community members in Senegal report a strong feeling of being unsafe.

Geography

Senegal is located on the west of the African continent. It lies between latitudes 12° and 17°N, and longitudes 11° and 18°W.

Senegal is externally bounded by the Atlantic Ocean to the west, Mauritania to the north, Mali to the east, and Guinea and Guinea-Bissau to the south; internally it almost completely surrounds The Gambia, namely on the north, east and south, except for Gambia's short Atlantic coastline.

The Senegalese landscape consists mainly of the rolling sandy plains of the western Sahel which rise to foothills in the southeast. The northern border is formed by the Senegal River; other rivers include the Gambia and Casamance Rivers. The capital Dakar lies on the Cap-Vert peninsula, the westernmost point of continental Africa.

Senegal contains four terrestrial ecoregions: Guinean forest-savanna mosaic, Sahelian Acacia savanna, West Sudanian savanna, and Guinean mangroves. It had a 2019 Forest Landscape Integrity Index mean score of 7.11/10, ranking it 56th globally out of 172 countries.

Climate

Senegal has a tropical climate with pleasant heat throughout the year with well-defined dry and humid seasons that result from northeast winter winds and southwest summer winds. The dry season (December to April) is dominated by hot, dry, harmattan wind.
Dakar's annual rainfall of about  occurs between June and October when maximum temperatures average  and minimums ; December to February maximum temperatures average  and minimums .

The northernmost part of the country has a near hot desert climate, the central part has a hot semi-arid climate and the southernmost part has a tropical wet and dry climate. Senegal is mainly a sunny and dry country.

Economy

Industry and trade 

The main industries include food processing, mining, cement, artificial fertilizer, chemicals, textiles, refining imported petroleum, and tourism. Exports include fish, chemicals, cotton, fabrics, groundnuts, and calcium phosphate. The largest export markets as of 2020 are Mali (20.4%), Switzerland (12.2%), and India (8.3%).

As a member of the West African Economic and Monetary Union (WAEMU), Senegal is working toward greater regional integration with a unified external tariff. Senegal is also a member of the Organization for the Harmonization of Business Law in Africa.

Senegal achieved full Internet connectivity in 1996, creating a mini-boom in information technology-based services. Private activity now accounts for 82 percent of its GDP. On the negative side, Senegal faces deep-seated urban problems of chronic high unemployment, socioeconomic disparity, juvenile delinquency, and drug addiction.

Senegal is a major recipient of international development assistance. Donors include the United States Agency for International Development (USAID), Japan, France and China. Over 4,000 Peace Corps Volunteers have served in Senegal since 1963.

Agriculture

Fishing 
Senegal has a  exclusive fishing zone that has been regularly breached in recent years. It has been estimated that the country's fishermen lose 300,000 tonnes of fish each year to illegal fishing. The Senegalese government have tried to control the illegal fishing which is conducted by fishing trawlers, some of which are registered in Russia, Mauritania, Belize and Ukraine. In January 2014, a Russian trawler, Oleg Naydenov, was seized by Senegalese authorities close to the maritime border with Guinea-Bissau.

Energy

Demographics

Senegal has a population of around  million, about 42 percent of whom live in rural areas.

Women

Senegal ratified the Convention on the Elimination of All Forms of Discrimination Against Women, adopted by the United Nations General Assembly, as well as the additional protocol. Senegal is also a signatory of the African Charter of Human and People's Rights, which was adopted during the 2003 African Union Summit. However,  feminists have been critical of the government's lack of action in enforcing the protocols, conventions and other texts that have been signed as a means of protecting women's rights.

Ethnic groups

Senegal has a wide variety of ethnic groups and, as in most West African countries, several languages are widely spoken. The Wolof are the largest  ethnic group in Senegal at 36%; the Fula and Toucouleur (also known as Halpulaar'en, literally "Pulaar-speakers") (30%) are the second biggest group, followed by the Serer (14.7%), then others such as Jola (4%), Mandinka (3%), Maures or (Naarkajors), Soninke, Bassari and many smaller communities (9%). (See also the Bedick ethnic group.)

About 50,000 Europeans (mostly French) reside in Senegal. Smaller numbers of other migrants, namely Lebanese Mauritanians and Moroccans reside in Senegal, mainly in the cities and some retirees who reside in the resort towns around Mbour. The majority of Lebanese work in commerce. Most of the Lebanese originate from the Lebanese city of Tyre, which is known as "Little West Africa" and has a main promenade that is called "Avenue du Senegal".

The country experienced a wave of immigration from France in the decades between World War II and Senegalese independence; most of these French people purchased homes in Dakar or other major urban centers. Also located primarily in urban settings are small Vietnamese communities as well as a growing number of Chinese immigrant traders, each numbering perhaps a few hundred people. There are also tens of thousands of Mauritanian refugees in Senegal, primarily in the country's north.

According to the World Refugee Survey 2008, published by the U.S. Committee for Refugees and Immigrants, Senegal has a population of refugees and asylum seekers numbering approximately 23,800 in 2007. The majority of this population (20,200) is from Mauritania. Refugees live in N'dioum, Dodel, and small settlements along the Senegal River valley.

Languages

French is the official language, spoken by all those who have spent several years in the educational system, in which French is used as the medium of instruction (Koranic schools are also popular, but Arabic is less widely spoken outside of the context of recitation). Overall, speakers of French were estimated to make up 26% of the population in 2022. During the 15th century, many European territories started to engage in trade in Senegal. In the 19th century, France increased its colonial influence in Senegal and thus the number of French-speaking people multiplied continuously. French was ratified as the official language of Senegal in 1960 when the country achieved independence.

Most people also speak their own ethnic language while, especially in Dakar, Wolof is the lingua franca. Pulaar is spoken by the Fulas and Toucouleur. The Serer language is widely spoken by both Serers and non-Serers (including President Sall, whose wife is Serer); so are the Cangin languages, whose speakers are ethnically Serers. Jola languages are widely spoken in the Casamance. Overall Senegal is home to around 39 distinct languages. Several have the legal status of "national languages": Balanta-Ganja, Arabic, Jola-Fonyi, Mandinka, Mandjak, Mankanya, Noon (Serer-Noon), Pulaar, Serer, Soninke, and Wolof.

English is taught as a foreign language in secondary schools and many graduate school programs, and it is the only subject matter that has a special office in the Ministry of Education. Dakar hosts a couple of Bilingual schools which offer 50% of their syllabus in English. The Senegalese American Bilingual School (SABS), Yavuz Selim, and The West African College of the Atlantic (WACA) train thousands of fluent English speakers in four-year programs. English is widely used by the scientific community and in business, including by the Modou-Modou (illiterate, self-taught businessmen).

Portuguese Creole, locally known as Portuguese, is a prominent minority language in Ziguinchor, regional capital of the Casamance, spoken by local Portuguese creoles and immigrants from Guinea-Bissau. The local Cape Verdean community speak a similar Portuguese creole, Cape Verdean Creole, and standard Portuguese. Portuguese was introduced in Senegal's secondary education in 1961 in Dakar by the country's first president, Léopold Sédar Senghor. It is currently available in most of Senegal and in higher education. It is especially prevalent in Casamance as it relates with the local cultural identity.

A variety of immigrant languages are spoken, such as Bambara (70,000), Mooré (37,000), Kabuverdiano (34,000), Krio (6,100), Vietnamese (2,500), and Portuguese (1,700), mostly in Dakar.

While French is the sole official language, a rising Senegalese linguistic nationalist movement supports the integration of Wolof, the common vernacular language of the country, into the national constitution.

Senegalese regions of Dakar, Diourbel, Fatick, Kaffrine, Kaolack, Kedougou, Kolda, Louga, Matam, Saint-Louis, Sedhiou, Tambacounda, Thies and Ziguinchor are members of the International Association of Francophone regions.

Largest cities

Dakar, the capital, is by far the largest city in Senegal, with over two million residents. The second most populous city is Touba, a de jure communaute rurale (rural community), with over half a million people.

Religion

Senegal is a secular state, although Islam is the predominant religion in the country, practiced by 96.6% of the country's population; the Christian community, at 3.3% of the population, is comprised mostly of Roman Catholics but there are also diverse Protestant denominations. Less than one percent has animist beliefs, particularly in the southeastern region of the country. Some Serer people follow the Serer religion.

According to a 2012 Pew demographic study, 55% of the Muslims in Senegal are Sunni of the Maliki madhhab with Sufi influences, whilst 27% are non-denominational Muslims. Islamic communities in Senegal are generally organized around one of several Islamic Sufi orders called tariqas, headed by a khalif (xaliifa in Wolof, from Arabic khalīfa), who is usually a direct descendant of the group's founder; the study found that 92% of Senegalese Muslims belonged to a Sufi order. The two largest and most prominent Sufi tariqas in Senegal are the Tijaniyya, whose largest Senegalese sub-groups are based in the cities of Tivaouane and Kaolack and has broad following in West Africa outside of Senegal, and the Murīdiyya (Murid), who are based in the city of Touba and has a follower base mostly limited to within Senegal.

The Halpulaar (Pulaar-speakers), composed of Fula people, a widespread group found along the Sahel from Chad to Senegal, and Toucouleurs, represent 23.8 percent of the population. Historically, they were the first to become Muslim. Many of the Toucouleurs, or sedentary Halpulaar of the Senegal River Valley in the north, converted to Islam around a millennium ago and later contributed to Islam's propagation throughout Senegal. Success was gained among the Wolofs, but repulsed by the Serers.

Most communities south of the Senegal River Valley, however, were not thoroughly Islamized. The Serer people stood out as one of this group, who spent over one thousand years resisting Islamization (see Serer history). Although many Serers are Christians or Muslim, their conversion to Islam in particular is very recent and came of free will rather than by force, after forced conversion had been unsuccessfully tried centuries earlier (see Battle of Fandane-Thiouthioune).

The spread of formal Quranic school (called daara in Wolof) during the colonial period increased largely through the effort of the Tidjâniyya. In Murid communities, which place more emphasis on the work ethic than on literary Quranic studies, the term daara often applies to work groups devoted to working for a religious leader. Other Islamic groups include the much older Qādiriyya order and the Senegalese Laayeen order, which is prominent among the coastal Lebu. Today, most Senegalese children study at daaras for several years, memorizing as much of the Qur'an as they can. Some of them continue their religious studies at councils (majlis) or at the growing number of private Arabic schools and publicly funded Franco-Arabic schools.

Small Catholic communities are mainly found in coastal Serer, Jola, Mankanya and Balant populations, and in eastern Senegal among the Bassari and Coniagui. The Protestant churches are mainly attended by immigrants but during the second half of the 20th century Protestant churches led by Senegalese leaders from different ethnic groups have evolved. In Dakar Catholic and Protestant rites are practiced by the Lebanese, Cape Verdean, European, and American immigrant populations, and among certain Africans of other countries as well as by the Senegalese themselves. Although Islam is Senegal's majority religion, Senegal's first president, Léopold Sédar Senghor, was a Catholic Serer.

Serer religion encompasses a belief in a supreme deity called Roog (Koox among the Cangin), Serer cosmogony, cosmology and divination ceremonies such as the annual Xooy (or Khoy) ceremony presided over by the Serer Saltigues (high priests and priestesses). Senegambian (both Senegal and the Gambia) Muslim festivals such as Tobaski, Gamo, Koriteh, Weri Kor, etc., are all borrowed words from the Serer religion. They were ancient Serer festivals rooted in Serer religion, not Islam.

The Boukout is one of the Jola's religious ceremonies.

There are a small number of members of the Bani Israel tribe in the Senegalese bush that claim Jewish ancestry, though this is disputed. The Mahayana branch of Buddhism in Senegal is followed by a very tiny portion of the ex-pat Vietnamese community. The Bahá'í Faith in Senegal was established after 'Abdu'l-Bahá, the son of the founder of the religion, mentioned Africa as a place that should be more broadly visited by Bahá'ís. The first Bahá'is to set foot in the territory of French West Africa that would become Senegal arrived in 1953. The first Bahá'í Local Spiritual Assembly of Senegal was elected in 1966 in Dakar. In 1975 the Bahá'í community elected the first National Spiritual Assembly of Senegal. The most recent estimate, by the Association of Religion Data Archives in a 2005 report details the population of Senegalese Bahá'ís at 22,000.

Health

Life expectancy at birth was estimated to be 66.8 years in 2016 (64.7 years male, 68.7 years female). Public expenditure on health was at 2.4 percent of the GDP in 2004, whereas private expenditure was at 3.5 percent. Health expenditure was at US$72 (PPP) per capita in 2004. The fertility rate ranged 5 to 5.3 between 2005 and 2013, with 4.1 in urban areas and 6.3 in rural areas, as official survey (6.4 in 1986 and 5.7 in 1997) point out. There were six physicians per 100,000 persons in the early 2000s (decade). Infant mortality in Senegal was 157 per 1,000 live births in 1950., but since then it has declined five-fold to 32 per 1,000 in 2018. In the past five years infant mortality rates of malaria have dropped. According to a 2013 UNICEF report, 26% of women in Senegal have undergone female genital mutilation.

In March 2020, the COVID-19 pandemic began in Senegal, which led to the imposition of a curfew in the country.

In July 2021, Senegal experienced a significant increase in cases of coronavirus disease.

In June 2021, Senegal's Agency for Universal Health launched sunucmu.com (SunuCMU), a website that the agency hopes will streamline health care in the country. The website is a part of the Minister of State Mohammad Abdallah Dionne's plan for digitalization. He aims to make Senegal's health care system effective and sustainable. Using SunuCMU, Senegal hopes to achieve 75 percent coverage within two years of the launch.

Education

Articles 21 and 22 of the Constitution adopted in January 2001 guarantee access to education for all children. Education is compulsory and free up to the age of 16. The Ministry of Labor has indicated that the public school system is unable to cope with the number of children that must enroll each year. Portuguese is taught at schools at the secondary high school level, given the large Cape Verdean community, and also from Guinea Bissau. There are sizeable Portuguese creole and standard Portuguese speaking communities in Zinguichor and Dakar.

Illiteracy is high, particularly among women. The net primary enrollment rate was 69 percent in 2005. Public expenditure on education was 5.4 percent of the 2002–2005 GDP. Senegal was ranked 105th in the Global Innovation Index in 2021, down from 96th in 2019.

Culture

Senegal is well known for the West African tradition of storytelling, which is done by griots, who have kept West African history alive for thousands of years through words and music. The griot profession is passed down generation to generation and requires years of training and apprenticeship in genealogy, history and music. Griots give voice to generations of West African society.

The African Renaissance Monument built in 2010 in Dakar is the tallest statue in Africa. Dakar also hosts a film festival, Recidak.

The Islamic festival of Eid al-Fitr, known locally as Tabaski, is popularly celebrated by Senegalese people. Despite being predominantly Muslim, the Christian festival of Christmas is also popularly observed, with Christmas trees and decorations lining up the city of Dakar.

Cuisine

Because Senegal borders the Atlantic Ocean, fish is very important. Chicken, lamb, peas, eggs, and beef are also used in Senegalese cooking, but not pork, due to the nation's largely Muslim population. Peanuts, the primary crop of Senegal, as well as couscous, white rice, sweet potatoes, lentils, black-eyed peas and various vegetables, are also incorporated into many recipes. Meats and vegetables are typically stewed or marinated in herbs and spices, and then poured over rice or couscous, or eaten with bread.

Popular fresh juices are made from bissap, ginger, buy (pronounced 'buoy', which is the fruit of the baobab tree, also known as "monkey bread fruit"), mango, or other fruit or wild trees (most famously soursop, which is called corossol in French). Desserts are very rich and sweet, combining native ingredients with the extravagance and style characteristic of the French impact on Senegal's culinary methods. They are often served with fresh fruit and are traditionally followed by coffee or tea.

Music

Senegal is known across Africa for its musical heritage, due to the popularity of mbalax, which originated from the Serer percussive tradition especially the Njuup, it has been popularized by Youssou N'Dour, Omar Pene and others. Sabar drumming is especially popular. The sabar is mostly used in special celebrations like weddings. Another instrument, the tama, is used in more ethnic groups. Other popular international renowned Senegalese musicians are Ismael Lô, Cheikh Lô, Orchestra Baobab, Baaba Maal, Akon Thione Seck, Viviane, Fallou Dieng Titi, Seckou Keita and Pape Diouf.

Cinema

Media

Hospitality
Hospitality, in theory, is given such importance in Senegalese culture that it is widely considered to be part of the national identity. The Wolof word for hospitality is "teranga" and it is so identified with the pride of Senegal that the national football team is known as the Lions of Teranga.

Sport 

Senegalese play many sports. Wrestling and football are the most popular sports in the country. Senegal will host the 2026 Summer Youth Olympics in Dakar, making Senegal the first African country to host an Olympic event.

Senegalese wrestling is the country's most popular sport and has become a national obsession. It traditionally serves many young men to escape poverty and it is the only sport recognized as developed independently of Western culture.

Football is a popular sport in Senegal. In 2022 the national team beat Egypt to win the Africa Cup of Nations for the first time, and they were runners-up in 2002 and 2019. They became one of only three African teams to ever reach the quarter-finals of the FIFA World Cup, after Cameroon in 1990 and before Ghana in 2010, defeating holders France in their first game in 2002. Senegal qualified for the 2018 FIFA World Cup in Russia, and for the 2022 FIFA World Cup in Qatar.
 
Senegal has traditionally been one of Africa's dominant basketball powers. The men's team performed better than that of any other African nation at the 2014 FIBA World Cup, where they reached the playoffs for the first time. The women's team won 19 medals at 20 African Championships, more than twice as many medals as any competitor. When the country hosted the 2019 FIBA Women's AfroBasket, 15,000 fans flocked to the Dakar Arena which is registered as a record attendance for basketball in Africa. Senegal was one of the continent's pioneers in basketball as it established one of Africa's first competitive leagues.

In 2016, the NBA announced the launch of an Elite's Academy in Africa, and more precisely in Senegal.

The country hosted the Paris–Dakar rally from 1979 until 2007. The Dakar Rally was an off-road endurance motorsport race which followed a course from Paris, France, to Dakar, Senegal. The competitors used off-road vehicles to cross the difficult geography. The last race was held in 2007, before the 2008 rally was canceled a day before the event due to security concerns in Mauritania. The Ocean X-Prix of the electric off-road championship Extreme E was also hosted in Senegal.

See also

 Outline of Senegal
 Index of Senegal-related articles

Explanatory notes

References

Further reading

 Babou, Cheikh Anta, Fighting the Greater Jihad: Amadu Bamba and the Founding of the Muridiyya of Senegal, 1853–1913, (Ohio University Press, 2007)
 Behrman, Lucy C, Muslim Brotherhood and Politics in Senegal, (iUniverse.com, 1999)
 Buggenhage, Beth A, Muslim Families in Global Senegal: Money Takes Care of Shame, (Indiana University Press, 2012)
 Bugul, Ken, The Abandoned Baobab: The Autobiography of a Senegalese Woman, (University of Virginia Press, 2008)
 
 Foley, Ellen E, Your Pocket is What Cures You: The Politics of Health in Senegal, (Rutgers University Press, 2010)
 Gellar, Sheldon, Democracy in Senegal: Tocquevillian Analytics in Africa, (Palgrave Macmillan, 2005)
 Glover, John, Sufism and Jihad in Modern Senegal: The Murid Order, (University of Rochester Press, 2007)
 Kane, Katharina, Lonely Planet Guide: The Gambia and Senegal, (Lonely Planet Publications, 2009)
 Kueniza, Michelle, Education and Democracy in Senegal, (Palgrave Macmillan, 2011)
 Mbacké, Khadim, Sufism and Religious Brotherhoods in Senegal, (Markus Wiener Publishing Inc., 2005)
 Streissguth, Thomas, Senegal in Pictures, (Twentyfirst Century Books, 2009)
 Various, Insight Guide: Gambia and Senegal, (APA Publications Pte Ltd., 2009)
 Various, New Perspectives on Islam in Senegal: Conversion, Migration, Wealth, Power, and Femininity, (Palgrave Macmillan, 2009)
 Various, Senegal: Essays in Statecraft, (Codesria, 2003)
 Various, Street Children in Senegal, (GYAN France, 2006)

External links

   
 Country Profile from BBC News
 Senegal. The World Factbook. Central Intelligence Agency.
 
 
 Trade
 Senegal 2012 Summary Trade Statistics

 
1960 establishments in Senegal
Countries in Africa
Economic Community of West African States
English-speaking countries and territories
Former British colonies
Former British protectorates
Former Portuguese colonies
Former Spanish colonies
French-speaking countries and territories
G15 nations
Least developed countries
Member states of the African Union
Member states of the Organisation internationale de la Francophonie
Member states of the Organisation of Islamic Cooperation
Member states of the United Nations
Republics
States and territories established in 1960
West African countries